Markus "Captain" Kaarlonen (born 16 November 1973) is a Finnish musician/songwriter/producer, and the keyboardist of the Finnish rock band Poets of the Fall. Kaarlonen first became known in the underground with his Amiga MOD music in the early 1990s. His first commercial album was released as Dance Nation's album Dawn in 1994. After that he worked as producer for pop group Aikakone.

Kaarlonen also worked for the software company Futuremark as a Senior Web Developer and Audio Designer. He has also composed and/or produced music for video games, including Rochard, Max Payne 2, Alan Wake, and Shattered Horizon.

Discography

Mod era 
 Spacemuzaxx
 Space Debris (Horizon Party 1990, Vårby school, Stockholm, Sweden)
 Beyond Music (The Gathering 1991, Parikkala, Finland)
 Broken Dreams (Assembly 1993)
 Mickus (Assembly 1994)

Commercial productions 
 Dance Nation: Dawn (1994)
 Poets of the Fall: Signs of Life (2005)
 Poets of the Fall: Carnival of Rust (2006)
 Poets of the Fall: Revolution Roulette (2008)
 Shattered Horizon Original Soundtrack (2009)
 Poets of the Fall: Twilight Theater (2010)
 Rochard: Original Soundtrack (2011)
 Poets of the Fall: Temple of Thought (2012)
 Poets of the Fall: Jealous Gods (2014)
 Poets of the Fall: Clearview (2016)
 Poets of the Fall: Ultraviolet (2018)

References

Finnish male musicians
Living people
Demosceners
Tracker musicians
1973 births
Video game composers
Place of birth missing (living people)